This is a list of all the United States Supreme Court cases from volume 553 of the United States Reports:

External links

2007 in United States case law
2008 in United States case law